Bloody Ridge is a suburb of Honiara, Solomon Islands and the location of a World War II battle.

References

Populated places in Guadalcanal Province
Suburbs of Honiara